Govinda is a name of the Hindu deity Krishna.

Govinda may also refer to:

People
Govinda II (reign 774–780 CE), King of Rashtrakuta dynasty of India after Krishna I
Govinda III (reign 793–814 CE), Indian ruler of Rashtrakuta dynasty and a successor of Dhruva Dharavarsha
Govinda IV (reign 930–935 CE), King of Rashtrakuta dynasty of India after Amoghavarsha II
Govinda Bhagavatpada, Guru of the Advaita philosopher, Adi Shankara
Gour Govinda (reign 1260-1303), last King of Gour
Anagarika Govinda (1898–1985), expositor of Tibetan Buddhism
Govinda (actor) (born 1963), Bollywood actor and politician
Govinda Julian Saputra (born 1996), Indonesian basketball player

Other uses
Govinda (2013 film), a Marathi-language Indian film
Govinda (Dahi Handi), a participant in the Indian festival Dahi Handi
"Govinda" (Kula Shaker song), a 1996 song by the British band Kula Shaker
"Govinda" (Radha Krishna Temple song), a 1970 single by the Radha Krsna Temple
Govinda, a character in Hermann Hesse's Siddhartha
Govinda's, a chain of vegetarian restaurants run by the International Society for Krishna Consciousness

See also
 Govind (disambiguation) (commonly used in Sikhism)